Living in a Moon so Blue is the fifth Jandek album, and was issued as Corwood 0743 in 1982. It was reissued on CD in 2001.

Overview 

Living in a Moon so Blue is an album that's very hard to separate from its near-counterpart, Staring at the Cellophane. Both albums feature the same parlor guitar on the cover (just from slightly different views) and the contents are remarkably similar, with Jandek delving further into the deep, anarchic blues while putting aside - for now - the female vocals and any instruments besides guitar, vocals and harmonica.

The albums are also distinguished by lean, blues-flavored songs with minimal lyrics, though these lyrics can run from brutal to humorously baffling ("Please don't push any buttons on this machine/On what machine?/Wet paint/Keep out" form the entirety of "Bludgeon," for instance). The music itself runs from fast, rhythmic blues pounded out on the oddly-tuned strings to slow, picked ballads. The vocals are at times otherworldly, at times visceral, and at times barely there at all.

Track listing

External links
Seth Tisue's Living in a Moon so Blue review

References

Jandek albums
Corwood Industries albums
1982 albums